Sir John Comyns SL (c. 1667 – 1 November 1740), of Writtle in Essex, was an English judge and Member of Parliament.

Early life
He was born the eldest surviving son of William Comyns, barrister, of Lincoln's Inn and his wife Elizabeth, the daughter and coheiress of Matthew Rudd of Little Baddow, Essex. He was educated at Felsted School and Queens' College, Cambridge.

Career

Comyns was a member of Lincoln's Inn, and was called to the bar in 1690. He entered Parliament in 1701 as member for Maldon, and represented that borough for 17 of the next 26 years (1701–08, 1710–15 and 1722–26). 

On the three separate occasions on which he was returned for Maldon, his opponents petitioned against his election, alleging bribery or improper conduct by the bailiff (who was the returning officer for the borough); but their only success was in 1715 when they also accused him of having refused to take the Qualification Oath, and his election, in that case, was declared void on those grounds.

He was made serjeant-at-law in 1705, and was appointed a Baron of the Exchequer and knighted in 1726, a Justice of Common Pleas in 1736 and Chief Baron of the Exchequer in 1738.

Works
Comyns is the author of Reports of Cases adjudged in the Courts of King's Bench, Common Pleas, and Exchequer. This work was written in law French. The Reports were translated by the judge's nephew J. Comyns of the Inner Temple, and published in one volume in 1744, with the sanction and approbation of the judges. They were re-edited in 1792 by Samuel Rose. He is also the author of A Digest of the Laws of England. This work too was written in law French, and afterwards translated.

Hylands House
Around 1726, Sir John Comyns purchased the manor of Shaxstones in Writtle, and commissioned the construction of a new family home on the estate, suitable for a man of his standing. 

Completed in 1730, Hylands House was an elegant two-storey red brick building in Queen Anne style architecture. The grounds were set out in the formal geometric style fashionable at the time, with a pleasure garden and small kitchen garden to the north of the house. It is now a Grade II* listed building.

Family

He married three times; firstly Anne, daughter and coheiress of Dr Nathaniel Gurdon, rector of Chelmsford, secondly Elizabeth Courthorpe of Kent and thirdly Anne Wilbraham. He left no children. Hylands passed to a nephew, also John Comyns, after the death of his widow.

See also
 William Chaloner

References
 
 Concise Dictionary of National Biography (1930)
Robert Beatson, A Chronological Register of Both Houses of Parliament (London: Longman, Hurst, Res & Orme, 1807) 
 T. H. B .Oldfield, The Representative History of Great Britain and Ireland (London: Baldwin, Cradock & Joy, 1816)

Notes

|-

1667 births
1740 deaths
People from Writtle
People educated at Felsted School
Alumni of Queens' College, Cambridge
Members of Lincoln's Inn
Serjeants-at-law (England)
Chief Barons of the Exchequer
Justices of the Common Pleas
Barons of the Exchequer
Knights Bachelor
Members of Parliament for Maldon
English MPs 1701–1702
English MPs 1702–1705
English MPs 1705–1707
Members of the Parliament of Great Britain for English constituencies
British MPs 1710–1713
British MPs 1713–1715
British MPs 1722–1727